What Doesn't Kill You... is an album by Candiria. Released on July 13, 2004, the album peaked at number forty-seven on the Billboard Independent Albums chart. The album was a departure from what Candiria is usually known for with more of a melodic sensibility. The album received critical acclaim with some of its original fan base being somewhat disappointed by the band's shift in musical direction. The album art was inspired by the band's near fatal van accident while on tour supporting their previous release, The C.O.M.A. Imprint. All of the band's members sustained severe injuries after being rear ended by an 18-wheel tractor trailer whose driver fell asleep behind the wheel.

Track listing
 "Dead Bury the Dead" - 3:24
 "The Nameless King" - 3:34
 "Blood" - 3:16
 "Remove Yourself" - 3:46
 "1000 Points of Light" - 4:02
 "Down" - 3:31
 "9MM Solution" - 3:37
 "I Am" - 3:17
 "Vacant" - 2:59
 "The Rutherford Experiment" - 5:01

UK bonus tracks:

11. Mathematics (live)
12. Improvisational Jam (live)

Personnel 
Carley Coma - vocals
John Lamacchia - guitar, backing vocals
Michael MacIvor - bass, backing vocals
Eric Matthews - guitar
Kenneth Schalk -  drums, programming

References

2004 albums
Candiria albums
Albums produced by David Bendeth
Earache Records albums